"Sand in My Boots" is a song recorded by American country music singer Morgan Wallen. It was released to country radio on August 23, 2021 as third single from his second studio album Dangerous: The Double Album.

Content
The song was written by Ashley Gorley, Michael Hardy and Josh Osborne. "Sand in My Boots" is a nostalgic ballad about a lost love, describes a worn out cowboy, weathering lost love and fading memories of drinking with that girl who could've been the one.

Critical reception
Billy Duke of website Taste of Country commented "Sand in My Boots" is the best songwriting on the album

Commercial performance
The song began receiving airplay on country radio in July 2021. It debuted on Country Airplay at No. 56 with 699,000 audience impressions in the week ending July 4, and reached number one dated February 26, 2022, becoming Wallen's fifth number one single on that chart.

Charts

Weekly charts

Year-end charts

Certifications

Release history

References

2020s ballads
2021 singles
2021 songs
Big Loud singles
Country ballads
Morgan Wallen songs
Song recordings produced by Joey Moi
Songs written by Ashley Gorley
Songs written by Hardy (singer)
Songs written by Josh Osborne